Helîm Yûsiv (Amûdê, 1967) is a Syrian Kurdish writer and lawyer. He studied laws at the University of Aleppo and has published in Lebanon, Turkey and Germany. He writes in both Kurdish and Arabic languages.

Works (translated titles) 
The Pregnant Man (1991, Arabic, Damascus, 1997 Kurdish, Istanbul, 2004, German, Münster)
 The woman upstairs (1995, Arabic, Beirut, 1998, Kurdish, Istanbul)
 The dead do not sleep (1996, Kurdish, Istanbul)
 Sobarto (1999 Kurdish, Arabic, Beirut)
 Mem without Zin (2003, Kurdish, Istanbul)
Toothless Fear (2006, Kurdish, Istanbul)

External links 
 DNB

1967 births
Living people
Syrian Kurdish people
Kurdish writers
Syrian writers
20th-century Syrian lawyers
Kurdish-language writers
21st-century Syrian lawyers